Hearts in Motion is the ninth studio album by British-Australian soft rock duo Air Supply, released in 1986. The album was a serious step down in the band's popularity.  While their previous self-titled album had charted gold, Hearts in Motion did not attain any certification, peaking at No. 84 on the US charts.

The album did not possess any successful singles, except for the minor hit "Lonely Is the Night" (#76 U.S.), which became a favourite among the band's repertoire, and "One More Chance" (#80).

Track listing 
All songs written by Graham Russell except where noted.

"It's Not Too Late" – 3:48
"Lonely Is the Night" (Albert Hammond, Diane Warren) – 4:13 *
"Put Love in Your Life" – 4:25
"One More Chance" (Steve George, John Lang, Richard Page) – 3:54 *
"Stars in Your Eyes" – 3:46
"My Heart's with You" (Graham Russell, Diane Warren) – 4:34
"I'd Die for You" – 4:45
"You're Only in Love" – 4:15
"Time for Love" (Randy Stern, Anthony La Peau) – 2:46
"Heart and Soul" – 3:54
"Hope Springs Eternal" – 4:11

Starred (*) songs produced by John Boylan; all others produced by Bernard Edwards.

Personnel

Air Supply
 Russell Hitchcock – vocals
 Graham Russell – guitar, vocals

Personnel (on Bernard Edwards-produced songs)
 Jeff Bova – keyboards, Kurzweil K250 programming
 Eddie Martinez – guitars, backing vocals
 Chris P. Rice – additional guitars on "Put Love in Your Life"
 Bernard Edwards – bass
 Tony Thompson – drums
 Bill Ballou, Roy Galloway, Phil Perry, Darryl Phinessee, Fonzi Thornton - additional backing vocals
 String arranged and conducted by Michael Gibbs

Recording
 Main Engineer – Josh Abbey
 Second Engineers – Scott Church, Craig Engel and Dan Garcia.
 Assistant Engineer – Bruce Buchalter at Electric Lady Studios (New York, New York, NY).
 Recording studios – Record Plant (Los Angeles, CA); Bill Schnee Studios (Hollywood, CA); Recorders (Cherokee, CA); Electric Lady Studios (New York, NY).

Personnel (on John Boylan-produced songs)
 Mike Botts – percussion
 John Capek – keyboards
 Michael Landau – guitar
 Timothy B. Schmit – additional backing vocals

Recording
 Engineer – Paul Grupp
 Assistant Engineer – Brett Newman
 Recorded at Sound City Studios (Los Angeles, CA).
 Mixed at Conway Recording Studios (Hollywood, CA).
 Mix Assistant – Richard McKernan

Miscellaneous
 Cover photography – Aaron Rapoport
 Stylist – Robert Trachtenberg.
 Naguchi coffee table – Harveys
 Hair and make-up – Wendy Tamkin
 Inner sleeve photography – Philip Saltonstall
 Art direction – Howard Fritzon

References

1986 albums
Air Supply albums
Albums produced by Bernard Edwards
Albums produced by Clive Davis
Albums produced by John Boylan (record producer)
Arista Records albums
Albums recorded at Sound City Studios